The 1984 Northwestern Wildcats team represented Northwestern University during the 1984 Big Ten Conference football season. In their fourth year under head coach Dennis Green, the Wildcats compiled a 2–9 record (2–7 against Big Ten Conference opponents) and finished in ninth place in the Big Ten Conference.

The team's offensive leaders were quarterback Sandy Schwab with 845 passing yards, Casey Cummings with 386 rushing yards, and Tony Coates with 311 receiving yards. Defensive lineman Keith Cruise received first-team All-Big Ten honors from both the Associated Press and the United Press International.

Schedule

Roster

References

Northwestern
Northwestern Wildcats football seasons
Northwestern Wildcats football